Meridarchis creagra is a moth in the Carposinidae family. It was described by Alexey Diakonoff in 1949. It is found on Sumatra.

References

External Links 
Natural History Museum Lepidoptera generic names catalog

Carposinidae
Moths described in 1949